Hégésippe Ibéné (born 8 April 1914 in Sainte-Anne, Guadeloupe - Sainte-Anne 28 May 1989) is a politician from Guadeloupe who served in the French National Assembly from 1973-1978 . Boulevard Hégésippe-Ibéné in Saint-Anne is named after him.

References

1914 births
1989 deaths
People from Sainte-Anne, Guadeloupe
Guadeloupean politicians
Guadeloupe Communist Party politicians
Deputies of the 5th National Assembly of the French Fifth Republic